"Baby, I Love You" is a song originally recorded in 1963 by the Ronettes.

Baby I Love You may refer to:

 Baby I Love You (album), a 1969 album by Andy Kim
 "Baby I Love You" (Aretha Franklin song), 1967
 "Baby I Love You" (TEE song), 2010
 "Baby I Love U!", a 2004 song recorded by Jennifer Lopez
 "Baby, I Love You", a song written by Jimmy Holiday and recorded in 1970 by Little Milton
 "Baby I Love You (Yes, I Do)", a song by KC and the Sunshine Band from the 1976 album Part 3

See also 
 "Babe I Love You", a 1992 song by Jandek from Lost Cause
 I Love You Baby (disambiguation)